Haemin (born December 12, 1973) is a South Korean teacher and writer of the Seon Buddhism tradition.

Biography
Haemin is a Seon Buddhist teacher, writer and the founder of the School of Broken Hearts in Seoul. Born in South Korea and educated at Berkeley, Harvard, and Princeton, he received formal monastic training from Haein monastery, South Korea and taught Asian religions at Hampshire College in Massachusetts for 7 years. His first book, The Things You Can See Only When You Slow Down has been translated to more than 35 different languages and sold over four million copies. His second book, Love for Imperfect Things was the number one bestseller of the year 2016 in South Korea and became available in multiple languages in 2019. Haemin resides in Seoul when not travelling to share his teachings.

In 2020 Haemin announced that he would be quitting all his public activities and returning to a Zen Buddhism education institution after facing backlash over his secular lifestyle.

Bibliography

Audio

References

Buddhist spiritual teachers
Princeton University alumni
Harvard University alumni
University of California, Berkeley alumni
American people of Korean descent
American Buddhist monks
South Korean Buddhist monks
American writers
South Korean writers
Zen Buddhism writers
1973 births
Living people
People from Daejeon